Cholestenes are chiral molecules that are derivatives of cholestanes that have a double bond. If there are two double bonds, the molecule is known as a "cholestadiene".  Examples include fusidic acid, lanosterol, and stigmasterol. Cholestene is a widely available chemical, used and sold commercially with red yeast rice. There are also derivatives of the molecule, such as 5-cholestene and 2-cholestene. These molecules differ by the placement of a double bond in one of its cyclohexane rings.

Preparation 
Cholestene has been synthetically prepared to mimic cholesterol, as they are used as important molecules to help important tools in the field of bioorganic and medicinal chemistry. Examples include facilitating siRNA transportation, enhancing DNA transfection, and potentially targeting tumors. In particular, researchers are interested in 3β-amino-5-cholestene, as it has a high affinity for phospholipid membranes.

3β-amino-5-cholestene, as well as other 3β-Derivatives, can be optimally synthesized from Cholesterol. The reaction scheme of 3β-amino-5-cholestene is shown below and adapted from Sun et al:

Figure 1: Multi-step Synthesis of 3β-amino-5-cholestene.

Applications 
Cholestene has been used as a dietary supplement and is often sold with red yeast rice to promote cholesterol management. However, these products contain a hidden drug ingredient, lovastatin, that may cause serious side effects when combined with other medications, such as muscle injury. Individuals with liver dysfunction or taking medication that weakens liver metabolism are at greater risk for these side effects, which may appear as muscle weakness, pain, fatigue and dark coloured urine.

In biological research, 3β-amino-5-cholestene (also referred to as aminocholesterol), a 3β-derivative of cholestene, has been shown to selectively enhance the magnetic susceptibility of lanthanide-chelating bicelles. When an aminocholesterol conjugate is used with different lanthanide ions, it can possibly fine tune a bicelle's magnetic susceptibility.

Derivatives

2-Cholestene

5-Cholestene

References

See Also 

 Red Yeast Rice
 Cholesterol
 Cholestane
 Fusidic Acid
 Lanosterol
 Stigmasterol

Cholestanes